Emperador is a brand of cut brandy and brandy produced by Emperador Inc., a 81% owned subsidiary of Alliance Global Group. The shares of Emperador Inc. are traded at the Philippine Stock Exchange with the symbol "EMP". The beverage is primarily sold in the Philippines.

Since 2006, it has been the world's top-selling brand of brandy in terms of quantity of brandy sold. Annual sales in 2015 amounted to 275 million liters. However, by international standards, the Emperador Light expression (introduced in 2010) is considered a "cut brandy" rather than a true brandy, as it contains neutral spirits alcohol made from sugar cane.

In early 2015, the brand was estimated to have a 97% share of the brandy market and a 50% share of the overall spirits market in the Philippines (population 100 million), and a 73% share of the spirits market in Manila.

Although the brand's market was initially limited to the Philippines, it has since expanded to Thailand, China, the United States, and other countries.

Advertising strategy
The advertisement approach of Emperador brandy emphasizes success in life and traditional moral values such as hard work, ambition, listening to parents' advice, and professionalism. The people featured in the advertisements were always dressed in a professional upper-class manner.

One of its first endorsers was the television journalist Noli De Castro during the 1990s.

History 
In 1990, Emperador Brandy was launched as Philippines' first brandy label. Emperador Brandy has since started to expand its brand footprint outside the Philippines. It holds its position as the world's largest "cut brandy" by volume and it is now being distributed in 40 countries throughout Asia, North America, Africa, Middle East, and Europe.

In 2010, Emperador Light was introduced with lower alcohol content and was targeted to younger alcoholic beverage consumers. Emperador Light sales were bolstered by a "Gawin mong Light" campaign launched in 2011. Sales increased significantly after that, rising from 57 million liters in 2009 to nearly 300 million liters in 2015. The label of the Light variation identifies the product as "Premium BRANDY Liqueur", rather than simply "brandy". This indicates that the product is a liqueur containing flavorings, sweeteners, and neutral spirits alcohol made from sugarcane, in addition to brandy.

After acquiring Bodega San Bruno in Jerez, Spain, the brand introduced an Emperador Deluxe variant in 2013. The brand saw a 7.6% reduction of sales by volume in 2015, but maintained its volume above 30 million cases (270 million liters), a level it has held since 2012.

In 2014, Emperador Inc. purchased the Scotch whisky producer Whyte & Mackay for £430m.

In 2015, Emperador Inc. made a deal with Beam Suntory for the purchase of several brands and production facilities for P13.8 billion (€275 million). The deal included the purchase of Fundador Pedro Domecq and Bodegas Fundador (Spain's largest and oldest brandy dating to 1730 with facilities in Jerez and Tomelloso), Terry Centenario (Spain's top-selling brandy), Tres Cepas (Equatorial Guinea's top brandy brand), and Harveys (the UK's top brand of sherry).

Popular in Asia, primarily in the Philippines and the Middle East, Emperador secured the top spot in an article in The Spirits Business in 2016 after making its sales figures available to the publication for the first time.

Awards 
In the 2016 International Review of Spirits organized by the Beverage Testing Institute in Chicago, Emperador Solera Reservada received a rating of 89 points and a silver award (highly recommended), and Emperador Light was rated at 83 points and received a bronze award (recommended).

References

External links

Alcoholic drink brands
Brandies
Philippine alcoholic drinks
Philippine brands